William Peck may refer to:

 William Peck (astronomer) (1862–1925), Scottish astronomer and instrument maker
 William Peck (MP) for New Shoreham
 William Buckley Peck (1870 - 1941) American physician, surgeon, and founder of the Inter-State Postgraduate Medical Association of North America
 William Dandridge Peck (1763–1822), American botanist and entomologist
 William E. Peck (1849–1897), American school administrator, founder of Pomfret School in Connecticut
 William H. Peck (1830–1892), American writer
 William R. Peck (1831–1871), American plantation owner, politician, and Confederate Army general
 William S. Peck Jr. (1916–1987), Louisiana state representative
 William S. Peck Sr. (1873–1946), Louisiana state representative
 William Virgil Peck (1804–1877), Associate Justice of the Supreme Court of Ohio
 William Ware Peck (1821–1897), Justice of the Territorial Wyoming Supreme Court
 Bill Peck (William Peck, born 1979), American guitarist
 Bill Peck (American football) (?–2017), American football player and coach